Innovaccer Inc. is a Silicon Valley-based digital healthcare company, founded by Abhinav Shashank, Kanav Hasija, and Sandeep Gupta that provides physician practices, hospitals, health systems, and other healthcare providers with different digital products. The company was founded in 2012 and is headquartered in San Francisco, California. In February 2021, the company was valued at $1.3 billion.

History

In 2011, Abhinav Shashank and Kanav Hasija started on a data analytics project at Wharton and Harvard University that focused on bringing distributed datasets together and leveraging data through analytical technologies. The project was a basic research on how big data can be studied, crunched, analysed and the insights that can be derived from the same. This was the basic idea that led to the formation of Innovaccer by Abhinav, Kanav, and Sandeep in Silicon Valley in 2012. 

In February 2021, Innovaccer confirmed a $105 million Series D that values the company at $1.3 billion, bringing its total funding to $225 million.

Products and Resources
Innovaccer provides digital products in the areas of Population Health Management and Pay-for-performance.  It also offers solutions for care management, referral management, and patient engagement. 

Innovaccer’s proprietary product, Datashop helps healthcare organizations provide better care by integrating complex data across multiple distributed sources to give insights. Innovaccer Datashop’s proprietary modeling algorithms normalize the data and links data across multiple disparate data sources. With a micro-services architecture, Datashop brings Lego-like modularity to help providers and networks pick and choose what they need. Applications within the platform include an Integrated Data Lake, Population Health Management, Care Management, Referral Management, and Quality reporting.

Apart from the abovementioned product offerings, Innovaccer has also launched several free tools offering comparisons and valuable insights for providers and payers. Some of the tools launched by Innovaccer are ACO Compare, Hospital Compare, Payer Compare, MIPS Calculator, and MACRA Toolkit.

References

Health care companies based in California
500 Startups companies
2012 establishments in California